Rand Chappell (born April 4, 1963) is an American college basketball coach.  He is the head coach at Johnson County Community College. Chappell has marked a career head coaching record of 402-213, led six teams to the NCAA Division II National Tournaments, and won more than 20 games in each season for 12 consecutive years.

Early career 
Chappell played for Charlie Spoonhour at Southwest Missouri State University and began his coaching career as a graduate assistant at the University of Mississippi and Missouri State University.  Chappell spent three seasons (1989–1993) as an assistant coach at Southwest Baptist University under head coach Jerry Kirksey where he helped guide the 1990–91 team to the NCAA Division II Elite Eight.

Chappell began his head coaching career in 1993 when he was hired as head coach at Labette Community College in Parsons, Kansas.  In his two seasons at Labette, Chappell posted a 45–17 record, led the Redbirds to consecutive Independent Tournament Championships, and reached the NJCAA Region VI Tournament both seasons.

In 1995 Chappell was hired as head coach of Phillips University in Enid, Oklahoma, and took over a program that had had three straight losing seasons.  During his three years at Phillips he guided the Haymakers to the No. 1 ranking in the final NAIA Division I regular season poll, compiled a 78–22 record, and led the team to two NAIA tournament appearances. He was twice named Sooner Athletic Conference Coach of the year and was named the Basketball Times National Coach of the Year in 1998.

Henderson State
Chappell served as the head basketball coach at Henderson State University from 1999 to 2003. During his five seasons at Henderson State, he guided his teams to an unprecedented four Gulf South Conference men's basketball tournament championships, three Gulf South Conference West titles, and led the team to five NCAA tournament appearances.  He compiled a 120–40 overall record and a 58–14 mark in Gulf South Conference games.  He was named the NABC South Region Coach of the Year in 1999.

In 2002–03, Henderson State was 30–5 overall, tying a school record, and reached the NCAA D-II Tournament South Regional championship game. The Reddies were ranked 15th in the nation in the final NABC/Division II Bulletin Top 25.

Central Arkansas 
Chappell took over the University of Central Arkansas program (2003) that went 5–20 the previous year and produced a 43–18 record in his first two seasons as the head coach of the Bears. Central Arkansastied for the league title and made their first ever trip to the NCAA II Tournament. They started the 2004 season with 11 straight victories and captured their first-ever national ranking. He led the Bears to two straight appearances in the GSC Tournament, advancing to the semifinals both years.

In 2006 Central Arkansas began its multi-year transition to Division I and joined the Southland Conference. The team was not eligible for post-season competition until the 2010 season. On March 5, 2010, Chappell was let go by Central Arkansas after seven seasons and posting a 104–104 record.

At the end of his D-II career (2005), Chappell’s overall coaching record was 243–79, which ranked him in the top five on the NCAA D-II list with a .761 winning percentage.  He also had the all-time highest winning percentage in Gulf South Conference history with .750 percent.

Eastern Illinois University 
At EIU, Chappell coached 11 All-Ohio Valley Conference performers, including three first-team and five All-Newcomer team selections, and four NABC All-District selections. He also helped the Panthers to six OVC Tournament appearances in seven seasons.

Johnson County Community College 
Chappell was named as the head coach at Johnson County Community College on May 15, 2020. In his first year, he led the Cavaliers to a 16-6 mark, a tie for the D-II Kansas Jayhawk Conference title, a Region VI Championship, and a berth to the NJCAA D-II National Tournament. The Cavaliers were also ranked all season, reaching the No. 2 spot for two weeks, and closed out the year ranked No. 11. Chappell also coached three All-KJCCC and All-Region VI performers. 

Johnson County finished the 2021-22 season 28-4 and ranked fourth in the final NJCAA D-II Poll.

Personal 
A native of Springfield, Missouri, Chappell graduated from Glendale High School.  He received both his bachelor's degree in finance and Master of Business Administration degree from Missouri State University. He is married to Molly Chappell and has two daughters—Lauren and Paige.

References

1963 births
Living people
Basketball coaches from Missouri
Central Arkansas Bears basketball coaches
Eastern Illinois Panthers men's basketball coaches
Henderson State Reddies men's basketball coaches
Junior college men's basketball coaches in the United States
Missouri State University alumni
Phillips Haymakers men's basketball coaches
Southwest Baptist Bearcats men's basketball coaches
Sportspeople from Springfield, Missouri